Sydney Water, formally, Sydney Water Corporation, is a New South Wales Governmentowned statutory corporation that provides potable drinking water, wastewater and some stormwater services to Greater Metropolitan Sydney, the Illawarra and the Blue Mountains regions, in the Australian state of New South Wales.

History

Name changes
The forebears of Sydney Water include:
 Board of Water Supply and Sewerage (18881892)
 Metropolitan Board of Water Supply and Sewerage (18921925)
 Metropolitan Water Sewerage and Drainage Board (19251987)
 Water Board (19871994) which had also been the colloquial name for the organisation for much of its history in the 20th century, and persists among longer term employees and older members of the community to this day

 Sydney Water Corporation Limited (19951999)
 Sydney Water Corporation (1999present) – with "Limited" being dropped when the corporation changed from a state-owned limited company to a statutory state-owned corporation.

Water supply management

Sydney Water's management received extensive criticism following the 1998 Sydney water crisis regarding what was believed to be the large scale contamination of Sydney's raw water supply. The supposed contamination was heightened levels of cryptosporidium and giardia in Sydney's Warragamba Dam. This meant the public had to take extra steps in their own homes to ensure tap water was safe to drink. After this event, the Sydney Catchment Authority was created to manage Sydney's dams, reservoirs, raw water and catchment areas. The Chairman of Sydney Water, David Hill resigned ten days after the crisis and denied any responsibility, claiming he was leaving only to concentrate on his political career.

On 1 January 2015, The Sydney Catchment Authority was merged with State Water Corporation to form WaterNSW so that WaterNSW is now the supplier of raw water to Sydney Water.

In June 2022, Sydney Water started working decentralized greywater recycling system producer Hydraloop for reducing water use.

Water restrictions
Since June 2019 Sydney Water replaced water restrictions with Water Wise Rules. The Rules are:

Level 1 water restrictions (subject to change at any time by NSW Government)
 All hoses must now have a trigger nozzle.
 Handheld hoses, sprinklers, and watering systems may be used only before 10 am and after 4 pm on any day – to avoid the heat of the day
 No hosing of hard surfaces such as paths and driveways (spot cleaning hazards allowed). Washing vehicles is allowed.
 Fire hoses may be used for fire fighting activities only.

Commercial Businesses who use water in the course of their activities are required to apply for a permit, it's free and can be done via the internet or over the phone call 132092, penalties may apply if caught working without a permit.

NSW government have empowered Sydney Water Community Water Officers the authority to impose fines of $220 for violations of the rules for individuals, $550 for businesses, and $2,200 for individuals and $4,400 for businesses water theft. Rules are enforced by Sydney Water staff known as Community Water Officers through random checks and intelligence gathered from the community.

Headquarters and influence

Sydney Water, and its predecessors, had for virtually all of its existence dating back to the 19th century, been located in the Sydney central business district at the corner of Pitt and Bathurst Streets, directly above Sydney's Town Hall railway station. The central location of Sydney Water in Sydney reflected the organisation's strategic significance as the lead organisation in planning Sydney's growth and future expansion. Without water services, no residential or business growth could occur in Sydney, the Illawarra or Blue Mountains.

Sydney Water's headquarters were relocated to Parramatta in May 2009. The historic former headquarters building has been redeveloped into a hotel, with the adjacent 1969 building being extended into a skyscraper.

The developer, Brookfield Multiplex, valued the new Parramatta headquarters project at A$176 million. Under this deal, rather than Sydney Water owning its own building, the corporation would enter a long-term lease with a private sector provider, who would own and maintain the corporate head office, at an annual rent charged to the NSW taxpayer.

The main Suburban offices throughout Sydney were all closed in the mid 2000's, including offices at Blacktown, Rockdale, Liverpool and Chatswood, with services consolidated to the Head quarters for efficiency. The Rockdale office was opened in 1990 and closed in 2004  These offices were traditionally dealing with customer queries, but saw a drop in use as customers started paying their bills via the internet

Desalination
In early 2010 operations of the Sydney Desalination Plant began; with a licence granted to Veolia Water Australia Pty Ltd to operate the plant and supply Sydney Water with drinking water. In 2012, the NSW Government entered into a 50year lease with Sydney Desalination Plant Pty Ltd (DSP), a company jointly owned by the Ontario Teachers' Pension Plan Board (50%) and two funds managed by Hastings Funds Management Limited: Utilities Trust of Australia and The Infrastructure Fund (together 50%). The terms of the 2.3 billion lease lock Sydney Water into a 50year water supply agreement with DSP.

Executives
From 1888 to 1987, Sydney Water and its predecessors were managed by the president, who effectively served as chair of the board and managing director. However, with the passing of the Water Board Act, 1987, the roles were split between an executive managing director and a non-executive chairman of the board.

Presidents, 1888–1987

Managing Directors, 1987–date

Chairs, 1987–date

References

External links
 
 Boundaries of the Metropolitan Sewerage District 1833

 
Government-owned companies of New South Wales
Water companies of New South Wales
Companies based in Sydney